Rifat Pradhan (born 9 August 1997, Narsingdi) is a Bangladeshi first-class cricketer. He is a right-handed batsman and right-handed medium first bowler.

References

External links
 
 

1997 births
Living people
Bangladeshi cricketers
Kala Bagan Cricket Academy cricketers